Musa Khan was an Ilkhan for 4 months.

Reign 
He was a grandson of Baydu. After securing Shaykh Hasan's neutrality, Musa's patron Ali Padshah went on to battle Arpa Ke'un on Jaghatu plains near Maragha on 29 April 1336. Arpa's army were led by 60 emirs, notably Hajji Taghay (son of Sutai, Governor of Diyar Bakr, from Oirats), Uyghur commander Ögrünch, Torut (a son of Nari and relative of Narin Taghay), Ortuq-Shah (son of Alghu) and Chupan's son Sorgan Sira. However, soon some emirs defected to the side of Ali Padshah, such as Mahmud b. Essen Qutlugh and Sultanshah Nikruz. Battle was a defeat for Arpa and soon after he was captured in Sultaniya and killed.

Subsequently, Musa was enthroned as new Ilkhan, in fact as a puppet of Ali Padshah. Supporters of Arpa Ke'un, namely Hajji Taghai meanwhile went to Jalayirid Hasan Buzurg, who in turn raised another Borjigid prince, Pir Husain as an Ilkhan on 20 July 1336. Chupanid Sorgan Sira again changed sides and joined Jalayirids at the battle of Qara Darra near Van. A Georgian contingent under Amirgambar I Panaskerteli, Duke of Tao also joined the battle on Jalayirid side. Despite Ali Padshah's contingents defeating Hajji Taghay and Ögrünch defeating Surghan, Musa was standing on center and badly defeated. As a consequence, battle was lost and Ali Padshah was captured and executed while Musa was forced to flee on July 24, 1336.

Despite losing his patron, Musa didn't relinquish his claim to Ilkhanate and retreated to Baghdad, later joining forces with Togha Temür in June 1337 occupied Soltaniyeh. However, he was soon captured by Emir Qara Hasan and killed on 10 July 1337.

References

Il-Khan emperors
14th-century monarchs in Asia